Pultenaea heterochila is a species of flowering plant in the family Fabaceae and is endemic to the south of Western Australia. It is an erect, low-lying or prostrate shrub with hairy leaves and yellow and red flowers.

Description
Flowering occurs from May to September and the fruit is a pod.

Taxonomy and naming
This species was first formally described in 1811 by Robert Brown who gave it the name Euchilus obcordatus in William Aiton's Hortus Kewensis. In 1863, Ferdinand von Mueller changed the name to Pultenaea heterochila in Fragmenta phytographiae Australiae, the name Pultenaea obcordata having been used by Henry Cranke Andrews for a different taxon, now known as Pultenaea daphnoides J.C.Wendl. The specific epithet (heterochila) means "unequal-lipped", referring to the sepal lobes.

Distribution
This pultenaea grows in sandy soil over limestone in the Avon Wheatbelt, Coolgardie, Esperance Plains, Hampton, Jarrah Forest, Mallee and Warren biogeographic regions of southern Western Australia.

Conservation status
Pultenaea heterochila is classified as "not threatened" by the Government of Western Australia Department of Parks and Wildlife.

References

heterochila
Eudicots of Western Australia
Plants described in 1863
Taxa named by Ferdinand von Mueller